Luca Kjerrumgaard (born 9 February 2003) is a Danish professional footballer who plays as a forward for Danish 1st Division side Nykøbing FC, on loan from OB.

Career

OB
Kjerrumgaard startes his career at Dalum IF, before joining OB as an U13 player. Kjerrumgaard worked his way up through the youth ranks and was a prominent goal scorer over the years. In September, Kjerrumgaard was called up for his first professional game for OB; a Danish Cup game against FC Roskilde. However, he remained on the bench for the whole game. On 29 October 2021 OB confirmed, that 18-year old Kjerrumgaard had signed his first professional contract and would be permanently promoted to the first team squad as from the 2022–23 season.

Not long after becoming a regular part of the first team squad, Kjerrumgaard got his official debut for OB; he came on from the bench to replace Ayo Okosun for the last 2–3 minutes in the season-opener against FC Nordsjælland on 18 July 2022. Kjerrumgaard also played in the following three matches.

However, on 31 August 2022, it was confirmed, that the 19-year old striker had been loaned out to Danish 1st Division side Nykøbing FC for the remainder of the season.

References

External links

Luca Kjerrumgaard at DBU

2003 births
Living people
Danish men's footballers
Association football forwards
Sportspeople from Odense
Danish Superliga players
Danish 1st Division players
Odense Boldklub players
Nykøbing FC players